Atanas Atanasov (born 4 February 1963) is a Bulgarian wrestler. He competed in the men's freestyle 130 kg at the 1988 Summer Olympics.

References

1963 births
Living people
Bulgarian male sport wrestlers
Olympic wrestlers of Bulgaria
Wrestlers at the 1988 Summer Olympics
Sportspeople from Burgas